Edward Luttrell Cullen  (5 September 1895 – 18 February 1963) was a New Zealand politician of the Labour Party, and a cabinet minister in the First Labour Government.

Biography

Early life
Cullen was born in Havelock North, and educated at Nuhaka Native School and Napier Boys' High School. He joined the NZEF as a Rifleman then Sergeant (No 12356) in World War I, and was awarded the Military Medal for bravery.

He farmed at Wairoa and became Director of the Wairoa Co-operative Dairy Company. In this position he actively assisted returned servicemen and local Māori in becoming farmers.

Political career

He represented the Hawkes Bay electorate from 1935 to  1946, having stood there unsuccessfully in 1931. In 1946, following an electoral redistribution, he won the Hastings electorate, but was defeated in 1949.

He was Minister of Agriculture from 1946 to 1949 and also Minister of Marketing from 1947 to 1949. He was a self described militarist and supported compulsory military training, an issue to which most Labour members were opposed.

Later life and death
After leaving Parliament he resumed farming and became a business partner of Sir James Wattie, producing many of the fruit and vegetables that were processed at the Wattie's cannery. He was approached several times to return to politics, but he declined.

Cullen died in Hastings on 18 February 1963, aged 67.

Notes

References

|-

|-

1895 births
1963 deaths
New Zealand Labour Party MPs
Members of the Cabinet of New Zealand
Members of the New Zealand House of Representatives
New Zealand MPs for North Island electorates
New Zealand recipients of the Military Medal
New Zealand military personnel of World War I
Unsuccessful candidates in the 1931 New Zealand general election
Unsuccessful candidates in the 1949 New Zealand general election
People educated at Napier Boys' High School